Marko Kolar (born 31 May 1995) is a Croatian professional footballer who plays as a forward for Wisła Płock.

Club career
Kolar started his career at Mladost Zabok and Tondach Bedekovčina before joining Dinamo Zagreb in 2008. He was the top scorer in the 2011–12 season of Croatian Academy Football League. In September 2012, Kolar signed a seven-year professional contract with Dinamo Zagreb. In the 2013–14 season, Kolar was loaned to second-tier club Sesvete. He was loaned to Lokomotiva for the 2014–15 season. Dinamo Zagreb extended his loan for the following season.

On 5 September 2017 he signed a contract with Wisła Kraków.

On 17 June 2019 he signed a 2-year contract with Dutch Eredivisie club FC Emmen.

Career statistics

References

External links

1995 births
Living people
People from Krapina-Zagorje County
Association football forwards
Croatian footballers
Croatia youth international footballers
Croatia under-21 international footballers
GNK Dinamo Zagreb players
NK Sesvete players
NK Lokomotiva Zagreb players
NK Inter Zaprešić players
Wisła Kraków players
FC Emmen players
Wisła Płock players
First Football League (Croatia) players
Croatian Football League players
Ekstraklasa players
Eredivisie players
Croatian expatriate footballers
Expatriate footballers in Poland
Croatian expatriate sportspeople in Poland
Expatriate footballers in the Netherlands
Croatian expatriate sportspeople in the Netherlands